Amira Hass (born 28 June 1956) is an Israeli journalist and author, mostly known for her columns in the daily newspaper Haaretz covering Palestinian affairs in the West Bank and Gaza, where she has lived for almost thirty years.

Biography
The daughter of two Holocaust survivors, Hass is the only child of a Bosnian-born Sephardic Jewish mother, who survived nine months in the Bergen-Belsen concentration camp, and a Romanian-born Ashkenazi Jewish father. Hass was born in Jerusalem and educated at the Hebrew University of Jerusalem, where she studied the history of Nazism and the European Left's relation to the Holocaust.

Journalism career
Frustrated by the events of the First Intifada and by what she considered their inadequate coverage in the Israeli media, she started to report from the Palestinian territories in 1991. As of 2003 she is the only Jewish Israeli journalist who has lived full-time among the Palestinians, in Gaza from 1993 to 1997 and in Ramallah since.

In September 2014 Hass attended a conference in Birzeit University organised by the leftist German Rosa Luxemburg Foundation and the Center for Development Studies at the university. She was asked to leave by two Birzeit lecturers because of a rule against the presence of Israelis (which she judged to mean Israeli Jews). She said that she had attended the university many times and had never heard of such a rule. The international conference's organizers were offended. The regional head of the Rosa Luxembourg Foundation, Katja Hermann, said after the incident that she would not have agreed to hold the conference at Birzeit had she been aware of the policy. The university later issued a statement saying, "The administration has nothing against the presence of the journalist Hass."

Views and opinions  
Hass identifies as a leftist. In 2011 she joined the Freedom Flotilla II to Gaza. In a speech in Vancouver, when asked whether there is any hope for the region, Hass answered, "Only if we continue to build a bi-national movement against Israeli apartheid."

In 2006 she compared Israeli policies toward the Palestinian population to those of South Africa during Apartheid, saying, "The Palestinians, as a people, are divided into subgroups, something which is reminiscent also of South Africa under apartheid rule."

In April 2013 Hass wrote an article in Haaretz defending Palestinian stone-throwing, calling it "the birthright and duty of anyone subject to foreign rule". She was criticized by left-wing politician Yossi Beilin and Adva Biton, whose three-year-old daughter was critically injured during a Palestinian rock attack. The Yesha Council filed a complaint with Attorney General Yehuda Weinstein and the police, accusing Hass of incitement to violence because stone throwing has caused serious injuries and death among Israelis.

Controversy

Defamation case 
In June 2001, Judge Rachel Shalev-Gartel of the Jerusalem Magistrate's Court ruled that Hass had defamed the Jewish settler community of Beit Hadassah in Hebron and ordered her to pay 250,000 shekels (about $60,000) in damages. Hass had published accounts by Palestinians that claimed Israeli settlers defiled the body of a Palestinian militant killed by Israeli police; the settlers said that the event did not take place and that Hass had falsely reported the story with malicious intent. The presiding judge found in favour of the settlers, saying that television accounts contradicted Hass's account and ruling that Hass's report damaged that community's reputation. Haaretz indicated that it did not have time to arrange a defense in the case and indicated that it would appeal the decision. Hass said that she had brought forward sourced information from the Palestinian community and said that it was the responsibility of newspaper editors to cross-reference it with other information from the IDF and the settler community.

Other 
On 1 December 2008, Hass, who had traveled to Gaza aboard a protest vessel, had to flee the strip due to threats to her life after she criticized Hamas. She was arrested by Israeli police on her return to Israel for being in Gaza without a permit.

After residing in the Gaza Strip for several months, Hass was again arrested by Israeli police upon her return to Israel on 12 May 2009 "for violating a law which forbids residence in an enemy state".

Awards and recognition
Hass was the recipient of the World Press Freedom Hero award from the International Press Institute in 2000.

On 27 June 2001, Hass received the Golden Dove of Peace Prize awarded by the Rome-based organization Archivo Disarmo.

In 2002 she was honoured with a Prince Claus Award from the Dutch culture and development organisation Prince Claus Fund.

She won the Bruno Kreisky Human Rights Award in 2002, the UNESCO/Guillermo Cano World Press Freedom Prize in 2003 and the inaugural award from the Anna Lindh Memorial Fund in 2004.

In September 2009, Hass received the Hrant Dink International Award, with Alper Görmüş.

On 20 October 2009, Hass received the Lifetime Achievement Award from the International Women's Media Foundation.

In December 2009 Hass was awarded the Reporters Without Borders Prize for Press Freedom "for her independent and outspoken reporting from the Gaza Strip for the Israeli daily Ha'aretz during Operation Cast Lead, the offensive which Israel waged against the territory from 27 December 2008 to 18 January 2009".

Published works 
 
 (With Rachel Leah Jones) Reporting from Ramallah: An Israeli Journalist in an Occupied Land (Semiotext(e), 2003) .
  A new English language translation of her Sephardi Yugoslav mother Hanna Levy-Hass' 1946 memoir, with addition of Hass' foreword and afterwords.

References

External links 

 
 Bruno Kreisky Human Rights Award
 World Press Freedom Prize
 Anna Lindh Award
 

1956 births
Israeli Ashkenazi Jews
Israeli Sephardi Jews
Israeli people of Romanian-Jewish descent
Israeli people of Bosnia and Herzegovina-Jewish descent
Israeli women journalists
Living people
Jewish writers
People from Jerusalem
Haaretz people
Post-Zionists
Israeli expatriates in the State of Palestine